The Scapegoat Wilderness consists of 239,936 acres (971 km2) spread across three different National Forests in the U.S. state of Montana. Created by an act of Congress in 1972, the wilderness is located in Lewis and Clark, Helena and Lolo National Forests. The Scapegoat Wilderness is a part of the 1.5 million acre (6,070 km2) Bob Marshall Wilderness Complex as it shares a boundary with the Bob Marshall Wilderness, which in turn is connected to the Great Bear Wilderness further north.

U.S. Wilderness Areas do not allow motorized or mechanized vehicles, including bicycles. Although camping and fishing are allowed with proper permit, no roads or buildings are constructed and there is also no logging or mining, in compliance with the 1964 Wilderness Act. Wilderness areas within National Forests and Bureau of Land Management areas also allow hunting in season.

The Continental Divide creates the western boundary of the wilderness. The highest peak in the wilderness is Red Mountain . The Continental Divide Trail travels through the wilderness roughly north to south.

With most of the wilderness heavily forested in conifers, the primary tree species found include Engelmann spruce, ponderosa pine, lodgepole pine and Douglas fir. The wolf and grizzly call the wilderness home as do black bears, moose, elk, mountain goats, bighorn sheep and mule deer. Rare sightings of wolverine and mountain lions are possible along with bald eagles, peregrine falcons, trumpeter swans and pelicans. Eight species of fish inhabit the lakes and streams with rainbow trout and northern pike being the most common game fish. Fourteen lakes are located in the wilderness as well as the headwaters of the Blackfoot River.

Pack trips on horseback are also a popular mode of travel.

Bugle Mountain (also known as "Bugle Peak"), located in the Scapegoat Wilderness, was the setting of a forest fire in the fictional 1952 motion picture Red Skies of Montana. The film, based in part on the tragic 1949 Mann Gulch fire, was filmed in Montana.

See also
Montana Wilderness Association

References

External links
 
 
 

IUCN Category Ib
Protected areas of Lewis and Clark County, Montana
Protected areas of Powell County, Montana
Wilderness areas of Montana
Lolo National Forest
Helena National Forest
Lewis and Clark National Forest
1972 establishments in Montana
Protected areas established in 1972